Youssef Seddik (born in 1943 in Tozeur) is a noted Tunisian philosopher and anthropologist specializing in Ancient Greece and the anthropology of the Qur'an.

Biography

In 1966, he obtained a master's degree in philosophy and a degree in French literature and civilization. During the next four years, he taught at the French school in Compiègne in 1967 and obtained a DES  (roughly equivalent to an MA) in Philosophy and a degree in Ancient Greece. 

From 1971 to 1977 he taught philosophy in secondary schools in Tunisia and at the University of Paris III: Sorbonne Nouvelle, before becoming director of a publishing company specializing in books for young people between 1984 and 1987. He was also a reporter of the journal La Presse de Tunisie between 1975 and 1983.

Based in Paris in 1988, he obtained a DEA in the Greek language and civilization from the  University of Paris III: Sorbonne Nouvelle (1988) and a doctorate at the École des hautes études en sciences sociales (1995). He lectured there and also in modern Islamic philosophy at the Sorbonne from 1995 to 1996.

Seddik has published many books and translations based on Ancient Greece and Islamic heritage, including works related to the Prophet Muhammad, Imam Ali, and the Qur'an.

In 1999 he published a book entitled Brins de chicane. La vie quotidienne à Bagdad au Xe siècle about daily life in Baghdad in the tenth century.
His book, Nous n'avons jamais lu le Coran, released in September 2004 explores the language and symbols that are present in the Koran. In the book the author begins with the questioning of the politics of Islam and the role of God.

He also directed documentaries including a series of five episodes on Muhammad.

Publications 

 Éloge du commerce (editing and translation of Ibn 'Alî al-Dimashqî's book), ed. MédiaCom, Tunis, 1994
 Penser l'économique, éd. MédiaCom, Tunis, 1995
 L’Abaissé. Première somme de la jurisprudence islamique (editing and translation of the book of Mâlik ibn Anas), ed. MédiaCom, Tunis, 1996
 Épîtres d’Avicenne et de Bryson (Translation with Yassine Essid), ed. MédiaCom, Tunis, 1996
 Dictionnaire historique de la pensée économique arabe et musulmane (With the collaboration of Yassine Essid), ed. MédiaCom, Tunis, 1998
 Brins de chicane. La vie quotidienne à Bagdad au Xe siècle (editing and translation of Tanûkhî's book), ed. Actes Sud, Arles, 1999
 De l'interprétation des rêves (editing and translation of Muḥammad 'Ibn Sīrīn's book), éd. Al-Bouraq, Beyrouth, 1999
 Dits de l'imam Ali, ed. Actes Sud, Arles, 2000
 Le Coran : autre lecture, autre traduction, ed. L'Aube, La Tour d'Aigues, 2002
 Dits du prophète Muhammad, ed. Actes Sud, Arles, 2002
 L'arrivant du soir : cet islam de lumière qui peine à devenir, ed. L'Aube, La Tour d'Aigues, 2004
 Nous n'avons jamais lu le Coran, ed. L'Aube, La Tour d'Aigues, 2004
 Qui sont les barbares ? : Itinéraire d'un penseur d'islam, ed. L'Aube, La Tour d'Aigues, 2007
 Le Grand malentendu. L'Occident face au Coran, ed. L'Aube, La Tour d'Aigues, 2010
 Unissons-nous ! Des révolutions arabes aux indignés (Interview with Gilles Vanderpooten), ed. L'Aube, La Tour d'Aigues, 2011
 Tunisie, la Révolution inachevée (Interview with Gilles Vanderpooten), ed. L'Aube, La Tour d'Aigues, 2014
 Ce que le Coran doit à la Bible : un dialogue contemporain sur l'islam et le judaïsme (With Isy Morgensztern), Paris, La Découverte, 2018

References

People from Tozeur
Tunisian philosophers
20th-century Tunisian historians
University of Paris alumni
Tunisian journalists
Anthropologists of religion
Islamic philosophers
21st-century Muslim scholars of Islam
Academic staff of the University of Paris
1943 births
Living people
21st-century Tunisian historians